Seçkin (literally "distinguished", "exclusive", "outstanding") or Seckin is a Turkish male given name, female given name and surname and may refer to:

Surname 
 Ece Seçkin (born 1991), Turkish pop singer
 İlyas Seçkin (1918–1996), Turkish civil servant, lawyer, politician and former government minister
 Tamer Seckin, American gynecologist

Given name 
 Seçkin Getbay (born 1989), Turkish footballer
 Seçkin Özdemir (born 1981), Turkish actor and former TV presenter, radio personality and disc jockey

Turkish feminine given names
Turkish masculine given names
Turkish-language surnames